Kalasar (also Romanized as Kalāsar; also known as Kaleh Sār and Kalleh Sār) is a village in Qareh Poshtelu-e Bala Rural District, Qareh Poshtelu District, Zanjan County, Zanjan Province, Iran. At the 2006 census, its population was 54, in 13 families.

References 

Populated places in Zanjan County